CNW Group Ltd., also called Canada Newswire and CNW, is a commercial press release service owned by Cision. Cision Distribution services in Canada are powered by Canada Newswire. The service is offered stand-alone or as part of its flagship Cision Communications Cloud platform for PR professionals.

History
CNW was founded in 1960 as Canada News Wire, by Joseph Adair Porter Clark (1921-2013) who became CEO and President of the news service. (Clark is the father of television journalist Tom Clark)

CNW originally delivered text news releases to news media outlets on behalf of paying clients. This model expanded over time to include the provision of ancillary services required by investor relations and public relations professionals, including translation, photography, webcasts, media databases and media monitoring.

Canada Newswire distribution switched to using XHTML instead of ANPA-1312, allowing for more formatting of releases. Which enables transmission of text. In 2003, CNW entered into a commercial endorsed deal with TSX for its newswire and webcast services through a paid sponsorship agreement.

CNW was acquired by US-based PR Newswire in 2013. PR Newswire was subsequently acquired by Cision in 2016. Cision was most recently acquired by Platinum Equity, announced October 22, 2019. 

On March 19, 2021 Business Insider reported Cision may be looking to spin off its Newswire unit.

References

Technology companies of Canada
Canadian companies established in 1960
Press release agencies